Calosoma morrisoni is a species of ground beetle in the subfamily of Carabinae. It was described by George Henry Horn in 1885.

References

morrisoni
Beetles described in 1885